John Stuart Morrison (born 7 December 1889 in Toronto – died 1 March 1975 in Toronto) was a Canadian chess master.

Biography
Morrison, whose father was a schoolteacher and principal, grew up in Toronto's west end. He discovered chess through books in 1907 and received lessons at lunchtime at the Toronto Engraving Co. from Alfred Hunter, a co-worker and Toronto Chess Club member. At 19, Morrison won his first Toronto championship; he won again in 1945. 

Morrison won the Canadian Chess Championship five times (1910, 1913, 1922, 1924, and 1926) and shared first place in 1931 (Maurice Fox won the playoff). He took twelfth place at New York City 1913 (José Raúl Capablanca won), took seventh place at New York 1918 (Capablanca won), and tied for 14-15th place at London 1922 (Capablanca won).

Morrison played first board (+5 –6 =4) on the Canadian team at the 8th Chess Olympiad in Buenos Aires 1939.

In 2000, he was inducted posthumously into the Canadian Chess Hall of Fame.

Several of Morrison's games are published in chess books including Capablanca's Chess Fundamentals.

References

Further reading
"Chess in Canada." American Chess Bulletin, v. 11, 1914

External links
 John Morrison Player profile. Chessmetrics
 John Stuart Morrison Player profile. Chessgames

John Stuart Morrison Player profile. 365chess

1889 births
1975 deaths
Canadian chess players
Sportspeople from Toronto
20th-century chess players